Mycke' mycke' mer, written by Lasse Holm and Torgny Söderberg, is a pop song in Swedish, which was performed by Swedish pop and country group Chips at the Swedish Melodifestivalen 1980, where it finished 4. it is a love song about being together, and was sung in a duet by Lasse Holm and Kikki Danielsson. The song was also recorded with lyrics in English, as A Little Bit of Loving.

Single
The single "Mycke' mycke' mer" had "Can't Get over You" as B-side. The single as best reached the 16th place at the Swedish singles chart. The song was at Svensktoppen for nine weeks during the period 20 April-31 August 1980. On 4 May 1980, "Mycke' mycke' mer" for first time reached the top position at Svensktoppen.

Chart performance

Cover versions
As a pause act during the Swedish Melodifestivalen 2010, Timo Räisänen & Hanna Eklöf performed the song.

Chart positions

References

External links

1980 singles
Chips (band) songs
Melodifestivalen songs of 1980
Songs written by Lasse Holm
Male–female vocal duets
Songs written by Torgny Söderberg
1980 songs
Mariann Grammofon singles
Swedish-language songs